Capital Airport Subdistrict is a subdistrict and an exclave of Chaoyang District, Beijing, China. It borders Nanfaxin and Houshayu Towns to the north, and Tianzhu Town to other three directions. It hosts Terminal 1 and 2 of the Beijing Capital International Airport, and as of 2020, it had a population of 16,837. Terminal 3 of Beijing Capital International Airport is located in Tianzhu, Shunyi District, Beijing.

History

Administrative Division 
As of 2021, there were a total of 5 communities under Capital Airport Subdistrict, in which 4 were residential communities and 1 being the working area of the Beijing Capital International Airport:

See also
List of township-level divisions of Beijing

References

Chaoyang District, Beijing
Subdistricts of Beijing
Enclaves in China